This is a list of episodes for Season 5 of Late Night with Conan O'Brien, which aired from September 9, 1997, to August 28, 1998.

Series overview

Season 5

References

Episodes (season 05)